Birsky District (Börö rayonı; , Pürö kundem; , Böre rayonı) is an administrative and municipal district (raion), one of the fifty-four in the Republic of Bashkortostan, Russia. It is located in the north of the republic and borders with Burayevsky District in the north, Mishkinsky District in the northeast and east, Blagoveshchensky District in the southeast, Kushnarenkovsky District in the south, and with Dyurtyulinsky District in the west. Its administrative center is the town of Birsk (which is not administratively a part of the district). As of the 2010 Census, the total population of the district was 17,924.

History
The district was established in 1930.

Administrative and municipal status
Within the framework of administrative divisions, Birsky District is one of the fifty-four in the Republic of Bashkortostan. It is divided into fourteen selsoviets, comprising seventy-five rural localities. The town of Birsk serves as its administrative center, despite being incorporated separately as a town of republic significance—an administrative unit with the status equal to that of the districts (and which, in addition to Birsk, also includes two rural localities).

As a municipal division, the district is incorporated as Birsky Municipal District, with the town of republic significance of Birsk being incorporated within it as Birsk Urban Settlement. Its fourteen selsoviets are incorporated as fourteen rural settlements within the municipal district. The town of Birsk serves as the administrative center of the municipal district as well.

References

Notes

Sources

Districts of Bashkortostan
States and territories established in 1930